Painting with John is an American unscripted television series created by musician, painter, and actor John Lurie. Each episode features Lurie painting watercolors and reflecting on life, music, and art. A six-episode first season premiered on HBO and its streaming subsidiary HBO Max on January 22, 2021. In August 2021, the series was renewed for a second season, which premiered on February 18, 2022. The title alludes to Lurie's earlier show, Fishing with John, from 1991.

Synopsis
Part meditative tutorial, part fireside chat, musician John Lurie shares his philosophical thoughts while honing his watercolor techniques.

Episodes

Series overview

Season 1 (2021)

Season 2 (2022)

Production
The episodes were recorded at Lurie's home on an undisclosed island in the Caribbean. In June 2021, Lurie announced a second season of the show was planned and for the first time in 22 years, he was rehearsing music for it. In August 2021, HBO renewed the series for a second season.

Soundtrack
The series' soundtrack features music by Lurie, who was a founding member of the Lounge Lizards and the creator of Marvin Pontiac.

Reception
The series has received positive reviews from critics. Robert Lloyd of Los Angeles Times wrote "Painting With John represents HBO at its most worthwhile: arty and unpredictable."Robert Ito of New York Times''  described the show as "a meditative and often joyful blend of painting and personal storytelling." On Rotten Tomatoes, the series holds an approval rating of 100% based on 15 reviews, with an average rating of 8.0/10. The website's critical consensus states, "A celebration of art and life through the eyes of a delightful curmudgeon, Painting with John is a surprising, intimate feat of TV joy.".

References

External links
 

Works about painting
Television series about art
Television series by Home Box Office
English-language television shows
2020s American documentary television series
2021 American television series debuts
HBO original programming